Joe White (born 1 October 2002) is an English professional footballer who plays for Exeter City on loan from Newcastle United as a midfielder.

Club career
Born in Carlisle, White began his career at hometown club Carlisle United before moving to Newcastle United in 2016. He signed on loan for Hartlepool United in January 2022. On 5 February 2022, White made his Hartlepool debut as a substitute in a 2–0 FA Cup defeat to Premier League side Crystal Palace. In February 2022 Hartlepool manager Graeme Lee said he wanted to sign White permanently. After a number of appearances for the club, White was injured in March 2022.

On 6 January 2023, White signed for League One club Exeter City on loan until the end of the 2022–23 season.

International career
He has represented England at under-18 level.

Personal life
His grandfather Peter Hampton was also a footballer.

Career statistics

References

2002 births
Living people
Footballers from Carlisle, Cumbria
English footballers
Carlisle United F.C. players
Newcastle United F.C. players
Hartlepool United F.C. players
Exeter City F.C. players
Association football midfielders
English Football League players
England youth international footballers